The Prefecture Apostolic of Kafiristan and Kashmir was a Roman Catholic missionary division.  It was under the Diocese of Lahore.

References

Apostolic prefectures
Former Roman Catholic dioceses in Asia
Catholic Church in Pakistan